In electromagnetism and applications, an inhomogeneous electromagnetic wave equation, or nonhomogeneous electromagnetic wave equation, is one of a set of wave equations describing the propagation of electromagnetic waves generated by nonzero source charges and currents. The source terms in the wave equations make the partial differential equations inhomogeneous, if the source terms are zero the equations reduce to the homogeneous electromagnetic wave equations. The equations follow from Maxwell's equations.

Maxwell's equations 

For reference, Maxwell's equations are summarized below in SI units and Gaussian units. They govern the electric field E and magnetic field B due to a source charge density ρ and current density J:

{| class="wikitable" style="text-align: center;"
|-
! scope="col" style="width: 15em;" | Name
! scope="col" | SI units
! scope="col" | Gaussian units
|-
! scope="row" | Gauss's law
| 
|
|-
! scope="row" | Gauss's law for magnetism
| 
| 
|-
! scope="row" | Maxwell–Faraday equation (Faraday's law of induction)
|
| 
|-
! scope="row" | Ampère's circuital law (with Maxwell's addition)
| 
|
|-
|}

where ε0 is the vacuum permittivity and μ0 is the vacuum permeability. Throughout, the relation

is also used.

SI units

E and B fields 

Maxwell's equations can directly give inhomogeneous wave equations for the electric field E and magnetic field B. Substituting Gauss' law for electricity and Ampère's Law into the curl of Faraday's law of induction, and using the curl of the curl identity  (The last term in the right side is the vector Laplacian, not Laplacian applied on scalar functions.) gives the wave equation for the electric field E:

Similarly substituting Gauss's law for magnetism into the curl of Ampère's circuital law (with Maxwell's additional time-dependent term), and using the curl of the curl identity, gives the wave equation for the magnetic field B:

The left hand sides of each equation correspond to wave motion (the D'Alembert operator acting on the fields), while the right hand sides are the wave sources. The equations imply that EM waves are generated if there are gradients in charge density ρ, circulations in current density J, time-varying current density, or any mixture these.

These forms of the wave equations are not often used in practice, as the source terms are inconveniently complicated. A simpler formulation more commonly encountered in the literature and used in theory use the electromagnetic potential formulation, presented next.

A and φ potential fields 

Introducing the electric potential φ (a scalar potential) and the magnetic potential A (a vector potential) defined from the E and B fields by:

The four Maxwell's equations in a vacuum with charge ρ and current J sources reduce to two equations, Gauss' law for electricity is:

where  here is the Laplacian applied on scalar functions, and the Ampère-Maxwell law is:

where  here is the vector Laplacian applied on vector fields. The source terms are now much simpler, but the wave terms are less obvious. Since the potentials are not unique, but have gauge freedom, these equations can be simplified by gauge fixing. A common choice is the Lorenz gauge condition:

Then the nonhomogeneous wave equations become uncoupled and symmetric in the potentials:

For reference, in cgs units these equations are

with the Lorenz gauge condition

Covariant form of the inhomogeneous wave equation

The relativistic Maxwell's equations can be written in covariant form as

 

where 

is the d'Alembert operator,

is the four-current,

is the 4-gradient, and

 

is the electromagnetic four-potential with the Lorenz gauge condition

Curved spacetime

The electromagnetic wave equation is modified in two ways in curved spacetime, the derivative is replaced with the covariant derivative and a new term that depends on the curvature appears (SI units).

where

is the Ricci curvature tensor. Here the semicolon indicates covariant differentiation. To obtain the equation in cgs units, replace the permeability with 4π/c.

The Lorenz gauge condition in curved spacetime is assumed:

Solutions to the inhomogeneous electromagnetic wave equation 

In the case that there are no boundaries surrounding the sources, the solutions (cgs units) of the nonhomogeneous wave equations are

and

where

is a Dirac delta function.

These solutions are known as the retarded Lorenz gauge potentials. They represent a superposition of spherical light waves traveling outward from the sources of the waves, from the present into the future.

There are also advanced solutions (cgs units)

and

These represent a superposition of spherical waves travelling from the future into the present.

See also

Wave equation
Sinusoidal plane-wave solutions of the electromagnetic wave equation
Larmor formula
Covariant formulation of classical electromagnetism
Maxwell's equations in curved spacetime
Abraham–Lorentz force
Green's function

References

Electromagnetics

Journal articles

 James Clerk Maxwell, "A Dynamical Theory of the Electromagnetic Field", Philosophical Transactions of the Royal Society of London 155, 459-512 (1865).  (This article accompanied a December 8, 1864 presentation by Maxwell to the Royal Society.)

Undergraduate-level textbooks

 Edward M. Purcell, Electricity and Magnetism (McGraw-Hill, New York, 1985).
 Hermann A. Haus and James R. Melcher, Electromagnetic Fields and Energy (Prentice-Hall, 1989) 
 Banesh Hoffman, Relativity and Its Roots (Freeman, New York, 1983).
 David H. Staelin, Ann W. Morgenthaler, and Jin Au Kong, Electromagnetic Waves (Prentice-Hall, 1994) 
 Charles F. Stevens, The Six Core Theories of Modern Physics, (MIT Press, 1995) .

Graduate-level textbooks

 Landau, L. D.,  The Classical Theory of Fields (Course of Theoretical Physics: Volume 2),  (Butterworth-Heinemann: Oxford, 1987).

 Charles W. Misner, Kip S. Thorne, John Archibald Wheeler, Gravitation, (1970) W.H. Freeman, New York; . (Provides a treatment of Maxwell's equations in terms of differential forms.)

Vector calculus

H. M. Schey, Div Grad Curl and all that:  An informal text on vector calculus, 4th edition (W. W. Norton & Company, 2005) .

Partial differential equations
Special relativity
Electromagnetism